The Unicorns played in List A cricket matches between 2010 and 2013. This is a list of the players who appeared in those matches.

Jahid Ahmed (2010): JS Ahmed
Arfan Akram (2010): Arfan Akram
Atiq Chishti (2010): Atiq Chishti
Luke Beaven (2011–2013): LE Beaven
Chris Benham (2011): CC Benham
Chris Brown (2010): C Brown
James Campbell (2011–2012): JRA Campbell
Steven Cheetham (2012): SP Cheetham
Tom Craddock (2011): TR Craddock
Wes Durston (2010): WJ Durston
Scott Elstone (2013): SL Elstone
Devon Endersby (2013): DM Endersby
Tom Friend (2011): TT Friend
Neil Hancock (2010): ND Hancock
Lewis Hill (2012–2013): LJ Hill
Paul Hindmarch (2012–2013): PR Hindmarch
Josh Knappett (2010–2011): JPT Knappett
Tom Lancefield (2013): TJ Lancefield
Warren Lee (2012–2013): WW Lee
Robin Lett (2011): RJH Lett
Jayden Levitt (2011–2012): JR Levitt
Matt Lineker (2013): MS Lineker
Andrew McGarry (2011): AC McGarry
Tom Mees (2010): T Mees
Jonathan Miles (2010–2011): JS Miles
Chris Murtagh (2010): CP Murtagh
Tom New (2012–2013): TJ New
Aneurin Norman (2013): AJ Norman
James Ord (2011–2012): JE Ord
Mike O'Shea (2010–2013): MP O'Shea
Craig Park (2011–2012): CM Park
Garry Park (2013): GT Park
Sean Park (2010): SM Park
Keith Parsons (2010–2013): KA Parsons
Chris Peploe (2010–2011): CT Peploe
Josh Poysden (2013): JE Poysden
Glenn Querl (2010–2013): RG Querl
Amar Rashid (2011): A Rashid
Luis Reece (2011–2012): LM Reece
Dominic Reed (2013): DT Reed
Michael Roberts (2012): MDT Roberts
Neil Saker (2010–2011): NC Saker
Tom Sharp (2010): TG Sharp
Chris Skidmore (2013): CJ Skidmore
Jackson Thompson (2010–2011): JG Thompson
Michael Thornely (2011–2012): MA Thornely
Bharat Tripathi (2013): B Tripathi
Vishal Tripathi (2012–2013): V Tripathi
Bradley Wadlan (2011–2013): BL Wadlan
Dan Wheeldon (2011–2012): DM Wheeldon
Rob Woolley (2012–2013): RJJ Woolley
Ed Young (2010): EGC Young

References

Unicorns